"Breathe Again"  is a 1993 song by Toni Braxton from the album Toni Braxton.

Breathe Again may also refer to:

 Breathe Again: Toni Braxton at Her Best
 Breathe Again (Danny Fernandes album), 2013
 Breathe Again (Spoken album), 2015
 "Breathe Again", by Alter Bridge, from the album AB III, 2010
 "Breathe Again", by Sara Bareilles, from the album Kaleidoscope Heart, 2010